Bioscience Horizons is an online scientific journal which publishes bioscience research. The journal has two aims: a) to publish high-quality research from students, both undergraduate and Masters.  b) to enable student authors to directly experience the process of academic publication, as corresponding authors. In 2014, the journal went international, attracting high-quality manuscript submissions from all over the world. Academic reviewers, who are experts in their fields, assess manuscripts as rigorously as they would for other journals. Bioscience Horizons is published by a consortium of UK universities in partnership with Oxford University Press and was established in 2008. The journal ceased publication at the end of 2018.

Consortium 
The consortium of universities that manages Bioscience Horizons are the universities of Nottingham, Leeds, Reading, Bath, Birmingham and Chester.

Awards 
In 2008, Bioscience Horizons received an award for publishing innovation and received a Highly Commended certificate from the Association of Learned and Professional Society Publishers.

References

External links 
 

Biology journals
Oxford University Press academic journals
Open access journals
Publications established in 2008
Biannual journals